Wilfred Gladstone "Wilf" Talbot (June 3, 1897 – November 4, 1946) was a Canadian professional ice hockey goaltender. He played with the Edmonton Eskimos of the Western Canada Hockey League in the 1921–22 season. He also played two seasons in the Big-4 League with the Edmonton Hustlers and the Edmonton Dominions. He died in 1946 at Victoria, British Columbia of an accidental gunshot wound to the chest. He was 49.

Wilf Talbot's younger brother Peter Thomas "Pete" Talbot (born January 31, 1899) was also an ice hockey goaltender in Edmonton, between 1914–1917, but died in World War I on May 23, 1918 at an age of 19.

References

External links
Wilf Talbot's career statistics at JustSportsStats

1897 births
1946 deaths
Accidental deaths in British Columbia
Edmonton Eskimos (ice hockey) players
Deaths by firearm in British Columbia
Ice hockey people from Montreal
Canadian ice hockey goaltenders
Firearm accident victims